Aliocha Schneider (born 21 September 1993 ) is a Canadian actor and musician who was born in Paris, but grew up in Quebec. He is most noted for his roles in the films Aurelie Laflamme's Diary (Le Journal d'Aurélie Laflamme), Closet Monster and Pompei.

He also acted in several plays including with the Théâtre du Rideau Vert, where he played the role of Momo in the stage adaptation of The Life Before Us.

As a musician, he released his debut album Eleven Songs in 2017. His second album Naked, followed in 2020.

Personal life
He has a younger brother, Vassili Schneider, and two older brothers, Volodia (actor and drummer) and Niels Schneider, also actor. In September 2003, his eldest brother, actor Vadim Schneider, died alongside actress Jaclyn Linetsky in a road accident while they were driving to the filming of an episode of 15/Love when the minivan lost control and collided with oncoming traffic. Their deaths were put into the storyline with Megan and Sebastien being killed in a plane crash while on their way home from a tennis tournament in Episode 12.

He is in a relationship with singer Charlotte Cardin.

Selected filmography

Music

Discography
Eleven Songs (2017)
Naked (2020)

Awards & Achievements
 EP Sorry Eyes nominated for the best Folk EP at GAMIQ, 2017
 Sorry Eyes nominated for the best Folk/Singer-songwriter song at The IMAs

References

External links
 

1993 births
Canadian male stage actors
Canadian male television actors
Male actors from Quebec
French emigrants to Canada
Living people
Canadian people of Lebanese-Jewish descent